Manny Díaz Jr. (born March 2, 1973) is an American politician who is currently serving as the 28th Education Commissioner of Florida. Díaz was a member of the Florida Senate from 2018 to 2022, representing the 36th district, which encompasses the Hialeah area in northwest Miami-Dade County. He also served three terms in the Florida House of Representatives from 2012 to 2018, which encompassed parts of Hialeah and Northwest Miami-Dade County, Florida.

Background
Díaz was born in Hialeah, graduated from Miami Springs High School, and attended St. Thomas University, where he graduated with a degree in human resources in 1994. He then attended Nova Southeastern University, graduating with a Master's degree in educational leadership in 1998. In 2006 Diaz completed the Harvard University Graduate School of Education Principal’s Summer Institute as part of the Superintendent’s Urban Principal Initiative.

Education career

Teaching
Díaz first worked as a teacher and baseball coach at Miami Springs High School. From 1995 to 1999, he taught social studies at Hialeah-Miami Lakes High School, where he spent eight years as an assistant principal. In 2013, he was assistant principal at George T. Baker Aviation School, a public vocational school near Miami International Airport.

Díaz denied allegations of discussions about drug use and inappropriate comments to a female student during his teaching career in the 1990’s. Diaz attributed the allegations to political attacks by a democratic marketing consultant.

In 2012, Díaz filed for bankruptcy, citing $1.3 million in debts.

Academica
From 2013 to 2022, Díaz worked for Doral College, a private college affiliated with the for-profit Academica charter school operator founded by Fernando Zulueta. For most of this time, he was its chief operating officer. Doral College was unable to receive accreditation by Southern Association of Colleges and Schools; eventually it received accreditation from a minor accreditor.

State government
Díaz championed many education bills including the creation  of the Family Empowerment Scholarship for students to attend private school while a member of the state legislature. On June 1, 2022, he assumed the office of Education Commissioner after his predecessor, Richard Corcoran, stepped down.

Political career
In 2010, Díaz ran for the Miami-Dade County School Board, but lost to Perla Tabares Hantman in the primary, receiving only 39% of the vote to her 61%.

Florida House of Representatives
In 2012, following the reconfiguration of Florida House of Representatives districts, Díaz ran in the newly created 103rd District in the Republican primary against former State Representative Renier Díaz de la Portilla and Alfredo Naredo-Acosta. Despite the nastiness and perceived closeness of the race, Díaz ended up defeating his opponents by a wide margin, winning 55% of the vote to Díaz de la Portilla's 39% and Naredo-Acosta's 6%. He faced only write-in opposition in the general election and won by a wide margin.
Diaz went on to be re-elected in 2014 and 2016.
He was Chair of the Choice and Innovation and K-12 Appropriations committee during his tenure. He was a key member of Representative Jose Oliva’s team. Oliva rose to become the second Cuban-American Speaker of the House in Florida.

Florida Senate
In 2018, Díaz was elected to the Florida Senate District 36, defeating Democrat David Perez 54.1% to 45.9%. His re-election bid received substantial funding from health care and education companies. Diaz was Chair of the Senate Education committee from 2018-2020 and Chaired the Senate Health Policy committee from 2020-2022.

During the 2022 legislative session, Díaz was the sole Republican to vote against the congressional redistricting plan, thus signaling his allegiance to Governor Ron DeSantis.

Political positions

Education
While serving in the legislature, Díaz sponsored legislation that would "allow more private online education providers, some from outside Florida," to offer classes to public school students; allow students to take classes in public virtual schools in other counties, and require the Florida Department of Education "to create a catalogue of online offerings."
He Sponsored a bill to create the Teacher Salary Category for public school teacher salary increases. He was the sponsor of SB 1048 which ended the FSA tests in Florida to be replaced by a new Progress Monitoring system. 
He rejected allegations of conflict of interest when, in 2017, he sponsored, along with Richard Corcoran and Michael Bileca, legislation that directed $140 million of public funds to charter schools. The three men and their wives were involved in the charter school industry.

Díaz sponsored the 2019 Family Empowerment Scholarship legislation and in 2020 a bill that significantly expanded publicly-funded vouchers for private schools, seen as the largest expansion of school choice in the nation by many.

Public health
During the COVID-19 pandemic, Díaz opposed COVID-19 vaccine requirements. In 2021, Díaz also said that he wanted to "review" any additional vaccine requirements for students, such as those for mumps and measles. By September 2021, Díaz had not been vaccinated against COVID-19.

Culture wars
In 2022, Díaz sponsored SB148/ HB7 in the Florida Senate, the “anti-woke" legislation backed by Governor Ron Desantis. After the legislation was signed into law in April 2022, Chief U.S. District Judge Mark E. Walker blocked key provisions of the law in November 2022. In his 139-page decision, he called the law "positively dystopian."

Personal
Diaz was a four year letterman college baseball player at St. Thomas University where he played for head coach Al Avila. Díaz's second wife, Jennifer, worked in Miami Dade Public Schools and in Miami-Dade charter schools. They married on December 11, 2010. She is former vice-chair of the governing board of the Tallahassee Classical School, affiliated with Hillsdale College. They have three children. Díaz's son Dominic, from his first marriage to Linet Gonzalez, played baseball at Longwood University.

References

External links
Florida House of Representatives - Manny Díaz Jr.
Better Florida Education - contribution records of Díaz's political committee.

|-

|-

1973 births
Hispanic and Latino American state legislators in Florida
Living people
Florida Commissioners of Education
Republican Party Florida state senators
Republican Party members of the Florida House of Representatives
American politicians of Cuban descent
21st-century American politicians
People from Hialeah, Florida
Latino conservatism in the United States